Panth (also panthan, meaning "path" in Sanskrit) is the term used for several religious traditions in India. A panth is founded by a guru or an acharya, and is often led by scholars or senior practitioners of the tradition.  

Some of the major panths in India are:
 Khalsa Panth (Sikhism)
 Sahaja Panth (Universal)
 Kabir Panth (Part of the Sahaja)
 Dadu Panth (Part of the Sahaja)
 Tera Panth (Jain)
 Satnampanth (Hindu)
 Nath Panth (Hindu)
 Varkari Panth (Hindu)
 Sat Panth (Shia, Islamic)
 Rasul Panth (Islamic)
 Pagal Panth (Islamic)
 Ravidas Panth (Sikh)

References
 Kabir and the Kabir Panth by G. H. Wescott,  South Asia Books;  (July 1, 1986) 
 The Bijak of Kabir by Linda Hess and Shukdev Singh, Oxford University Press, 2002
 One Hundred Poems of Kabir: Translated by Rabindranath Tagore. Assisted by Evelin Underhill, Adamant Media Corporation, 2005
 Crossing the Threshold: Understanding Religious Identities in South Asia by Dominique Sila-Khan, I. B. Tauris in Association with the Institute of Ismaili Studies; (November 4, 2004)

Indian religions
Sanskrit words and phrases